Midnight Patrol may refer to:

 The Midnight Patrol (1932 film), 1932 American drama film directed by Christy Cabanne
 The Midnight Patrol, 1933 American comedy film starring Laurel and Hardy
 Midnight Patrol: Adventures in the Dream Zone, a 1990 British-American animated series